The Ministry of Rural Development, a branch of the Government of India, is entrusted with the task of accelerating the socio-economic development of rural India.  Its focus is on special rural grants for health and education, piped filtered drinking water programs, public and affordable housing programs, public work programs and grants for rural roads and infrastructure. It also provides special grants to rural local bodies.

On 7 July 2021, during the first cabinet reshuffle of the Second Modi ministry, Giriraj Singh replaced Narendra Singh Tomar as the Minister of Rural Development.

Departments
The ministry has two departments: the Department of Rural Development and the Department of Land Resources. Each is headed by a senior civil servant designated as the Secretary of the Department. Anita Choudhry is the secretary of Land Resources and Jugal Kishore Mahapatra, a senior bureaucrat from Odisha, is the secretary of the Ministry of Rural Development.

Department of Rural Development
The department run three national-level schemes: Pradhan Mantri Gram Sadak Yojana (PMGSY) for rural roads development, Swarnajayanti Gram Swarozgar Yojana (SGSY) rural employment and for rural housing, Pradhan Mantri Awas Yojana It handles the administration of District Rural Development Agency (DRDA), and has three autonomous organisations under it:

Council of Advancement of People's Action and Rural Technology (CAPART)
 National Institute of Rural Development (NIRD)
 National Rural Road Development Agency (NRRDA)
The Minister of Rural Development is the Chairman of these three organisations and the Secretary of the Ministry is the Vice-Chairman. The Minister is currently Mr Giriraj Singh, and the Secretary is Subrahmanyam Vijay Kumar.

Department of Land Resources
The Department of Land Resources runs three national-level programs:

Pradhan Mantri Krishi Sinchayee Yojna (Watershed Development Component)
Digital India Land Record Modernization Programme
Neeranchal National Watershed Project
Other Programmes
GIZ led pilot Land Use Planning and Management Project
 Ease of Doing Business - Initiatives

List of Ministers

Ministers of State

See also
 District Rural Development Agencies (India)
 NREGS (Kerala)

References

External links
 
  National Rural Employment Guarantee Act, website

R
Rural development organisations in India
Rural development ministries